Irene Tsu (born November 4, 1945) is a Chinese American actress who made her debut in the film adaptation of Flower Drum Song in 1961, and has had many subsequent roles in TV and films. She was featured playing the wiki wiki girl in the Wiki wiki dollar advertising campaign for Chevron Corporation in the 1960s. She speaks English and three varieties of Chinese.

Early life and career 
Tsu was born in Shanghai, China to Z.M. and Dulcie Lynn Tsu. Her father was a banker and her mother a painter. After political changes in China in the 1940s, the family left for Taiwan, then Hong Kong. Her father remained behind in Taiwan while in 1957 she and the rest of her immediate family (sister and mother) emigrated to Larchmont, New York, a suburb of New York City, where her aunt lived. Irene attended Mamaroneck Elementary School in Mamaroneck, New York and studied ballet.

In the late 1950s. she auditioned for a dancing job in Broadway's Flower Drum Song. A staff member of the producer David Merrick's office saw the performance and auditioned her for the Broadway musical "The World of Suzie Wong" and Tsu got a part. Later Irene auditioned for choreographer Hermes Pan  in the upcoming film adaptation of the musical Flower Drum Song. The choreographer brought Irene to Hollywood and she was a teenage dancer in the film Flower Drum Song (1961), directed by Henry Koster. He gave her her first speaking role as a teenage prostitute in his next film, Take Her, She's Mine (1963) starring James Stewart and Sandra Dee, which started her acting career.

She studied acting with Ned Maderino, Lee Strasberg and Peggy Feury and attended Los Angeles City College, UCLA Film School, and California State University, Los Angeles.

In 1961, Tsu entered the Miss Chinatown USA beauty pageant on behalf of New York and won first place.

On November 21, 1963, the evening before President John F. Kennedy was assassinated, Tsu's only appearance on Perry Mason was aired on CBS, as she played the role of defendant Juli Eng in "The Case of the Floating Stones." She made guest appearances on most of the other popular '60s-70s television shows such as I Spy, The Man From U.N.C.L.E., Voyage to the Bottom of the Sea, Family Affair, Mission: Impossible, "Wonder Woman" and The Wild Wild West. She was tested for, but didn't get the female lead of The Sand Pebbles.
In the 1960s, Tsu met Frank Sinatra in Miami, Florida where she was filming the "Chevron Island" commercials and Sinatra was filming Tony Rome. They dated for over two years.

Tsu later married director Ivan Nagy in 1971.

Later career 
From 1978 until 1989, Tsu was Chief Operating Officer and head designer for her own leisure apparel company, The IT Company/Irene Tsu Designs.

Since 1990 Irene has been a realtor for Coldwell Banker in Beverly Hills, California. She is a single mother to her daughter, Yasmine, and a yoga practitioner for more than 25 years. Irene studied for many years directly with yoga master Bikram Choudhury and is featured in both of his books Bikram's Beginning Yoga Class.  She taught at Bikram Yoga College in Encinitas, California. She teaches weekly yoga classes at the Bikram HQ in Los Angeles and for the Beverly Hills Department of Parks.

In addition to these new ventures, Tsu has continued to act in TV and film roles over the years, although after she adopted her niece from China as her daughter, she concentrated primarily on being a mother.

Selected filmography

Film 

Flower Drum Song (1961) as Dancer (uncredited)
The Horizontal Lieutenant (1962) as Oriental Spy (uncredited)
Under the Yum Yum Tree (1963) as Suzy (uncredited)
Take Her, She's Mine (1963) as Miss Wu
John Goldfarb, Please Come Home! (1965) as Harem Girl (uncredited)
The Sword of Ali Baba (1965) as Nalu
How to Stuff a Wild Bikini (1965) as Native Girl
Seven Women (1966) as Chinese Girl
Women of the Prehistoric Planet (1966) as Linda
Paradise, Hawaiian Style (1966) as Pua
Caprice (1967) as Su Ling
Island of the Lost (1967) as Judy Hawllani
The Green Berets (1968) as Lin
The Yin and the Yang of Mr. Go (1970) as Tah-Ling
Stand Up and Be Counted (1972) (uncredited)
Three the Hard Way (1974) as Empress
Airport 1975 (1974) as Carol
Judge Dee and the Monastery Murders (1974, TV Movie) as Celestial Image
Paper Tiger (1975) as Talah
Deadly Hero (1975)
Hot Potato (1976) as Detective Sgt. Pam Varaje
Damien's Island (1976) as Momi
Down and Out in Beverly Hills (1986) as Sheila Waltzberg
Steele Justice (1987) as Xua Chan
A Girl to Kill For (1990) as The Counselor
Unbecoming Age (1992) as R.J
Mr. Jones (1993) as Mrs. Chang
Snapdragon (1993) as Hua
Comrades: Almost a Love Story (1996) as Aunt Rosie
Golden Chicken (2002) as Kam's Aunt
The Heart Specialist (2006) as Mrs. Olson
Alibi (2007) as Chu Fan

Television 

Perry Mason TV series, episode: The Case of the Floating Stones (21 November 1963) as Juli Eng
My Favorite Martian TV series, Season 2 Episode 9 - Double Trouble (1964) as Leilani
The Man from U.N.C.L.E. TV series, episode: The Hong Kong Shilling Affair (15 March 1965) as Jasmine
I Spy TV series, episode: A Cup of Kindness (22 September 1965)
Voyage to the Bottom of the Sea TV series, episode: The Peacemaker (November 21, 1965) as Su Yin
My Three Sons, TV series, episode: Robbie and the Slave Girl (20 January 1966) as Terry
The Man from U.N.C.L.E. TV series, episode: The Five Daughters Affair: Part II (7 April 1967) - Reikko
The Wild Wild West TV series, episode: The Night of the Samurai (13 October 1967) - Reiko O'Hara
Family Affair TV series, episode: Eastward Ho (1970) - Ming Lee
Mission: Impossible TV series, episode: Double Dead (12 February 1972) as Penyo
Hawaii Five-O TV series, episode: Engaged to Be Buried (27 February 1973) as Alia
Future Cop TV series (1977) as Doctor Tingley
The Rockford Files, TV series, episode: Irving the Explainer (18 November 1977) as Daphne Ishawaharda
Wonder Woman, TV series, episode: The Man Who Made Volcanoes (18 November 1977) as Mei Ling
Trapper John, M.D., TV series, episode: Heart and Seoul (28 January 1986) as Dr. Julie Lok
Noble House (1988) all four episodes
Tell Me No Secrets, (1997) TV movie
Star Trek: Voyager, TV series, episode: Author, Author (April 18, 2001) as Mary Kim
Cold Case, TV series, episode: Chinatown (22 November 2009) as Da Chun Lu
Law & Order: LA TV series, episode: Angel's Knoll (25 May 2011) as Christina Yu

Notes

References

Sources
 Lisanti, Tom, ''Fantasy femmes of sixties cinema: interviews with 20 actresses from biker, beach, and Elvis movies", McFarland Publishing, 2001. Cf. pp.158-169 for entry on Irene Tsu.
 Lisanti, Tom; Paul, Louis, Film fatales: women in espionage films and television, 1962-1973, McFarland Publishing, 2002. See pp.293-295 for the entry on Irene Tsu.

Further reading 
 "My life: Irene Tsu", Post magazine, South China Morning Post, interview with Kate Whitehead, January 26, 2014

External links
 
 

1944 births
Living people
Chinese emigrants to the United States
Actresses from San Francisco
American television actresses
Los Angeles City College alumni
American film actresses
20th-century American actresses
People from Mamaroneck, New York
Actresses from New York (state)
Actresses from Shanghai
Chinese Civil War refugees
Chinese film actresses
Chinese television actresses
20th-century Chinese actresses
21st-century American women